Audio editing software is any software or computer program, which allows editing and generating of audio data. Audio editing software can be implemented completely or partly as a library, as a computer application, as a web application, or as a loadable kernel module. Wave editors are digital audio editors. There are many sources of software available to perform this function. Most can edit music, apply effects and filters, adjust stereo channels, etc.

A digital audio workstation (DAW) consists of software to a great degree, and usually is composed of many distinct software suite components, giving access to them through a unified graphical user interface using GTK, Qt, or another library for the GUI widgets. DAWs are used for recording or producing  music, sound effects and more.

History

The first DAW was invented in the late 70s and early 80s. The first DAW was a digital recorder developed by Soundstream in 1977. In the 70s and 80s, the main challenge faced when creating a DAW was finding inexpensive high-performance storage.

Editors designed for use with music
Editors designed for use with music typically allow the user to do the following:
The ability to import and export various audio file formats for editing.
Record audio from one or more inputs and store recordings in the computer's memory as digital audio.
Edit the start time, stop time, and duration of any sound on the audio timeline.
Fade into or out of a clip (e.g. an S-fade out during applause after a performance), or between clips (e.g. crossfading between takes).
Mix multiple sound sources/tracks, combine them at various volume levels and pan from channel to channel to one or more output tracks
Apply simple or advanced effects or filters, including amplification, normalization, limiting, panning, compression, expansion, flanging, reverb, audio noise reduction, and equalization to change the audio.
Playback sound (often after being mixed) that can be sent to one or more outputs, such as speakers, additional processors, or a recording medium
Conversion between different audio file formats, or between different sound quality levels.
Typically these tasks can be performed in a manner that is non-linear. Audio editors may process the audio data non-destructively in real-time, or destructively as an "off-line" process, or a hybrid with some real-time effects and some offline effects.

Editors designed for use in speech research
Editors designed for use in speech research add the ability to make measurements and perform acoustic analyses such as extracting and displaying a fundamental frequency contour or spectrogram. They typically lack most or all of the effects that interest musicians.

Plug-ins
Audio Plug-ins are small software programs that can be "plugged in" to use inside your main workstation. Plug-ins are used in DAWs to allow more capabilities when it comes to audio editing.  There are several different types of plug-ins. For example, stock plug-ins are the basic plug-ins that come already installed with your DAW, and VST (Virtual Studio Technology) plug-ins. Invented by Steinberg, VST plug-ins allow producers to then apply simple or advanced effects such as filters, limiting, compression, reverb, flanging, panning, noise reduction, and equalizers.

MIDI vs Audio
MIDI (pronounced "middy") and audio are both compressed digital formats that are used within a Digital Audio Workspace (DAW). MIDI stands for Musical Instrument Digital Interface. MIDI is used with plug-ins that allow the user to control the notes of various plug-in instruments. MIDI is universally accepted and if one plug-in or synthesizer was used using MIDI, then it can be modified with another synthesizer. The filename extension of MIDI format is .MIDI or .MID. Unlike MIDI, Digital audio contains a recording of sound. Audio files are a lot larger than MIDI files, and while MIDI is smaller, MIDI can have variations from the original sounds.

Comparison of destructive and real-time editing
Destructive editing modifies the data of the original audio file, as opposed to just editing its playback parameters. Destructive editors are also known as sample editors. Destructive editing applies edits and processing directly to the audio data, changing the data immediately. If, for example, part of a track is deleted, the deleted audio data is immediately removed from that part of the track.

Real-time editing does not apply changes immediately but applies edits and processing on the fly during playback. If, for example, part of a track is deleted, the deleted audio data is not actually removed from the track, but is hidden and will be skipped on playback.

Advantages of destructive editing
In graphical editors, every change to the audio is usually visible immediately as the visible waveform is updated to match the audio data.
The number of effects that may be applied is virtually unlimited (though may be limited by disk space available for "undo" data).
Editing is usually precise down to exact sample intervals.
Effects may be applied to a precisely specified selected region.
Mixing down or exporting the edited audio is usually relatively quick as little additional processing is required.

Limitations of destructive editing
Once an effect has been applied, it cannot usually be changed. This is usually mitigated by the ability to "undo" the last performed action. Typically a destructive audio editor will maintain many levels of "undo history" so that multiple actions may be undone in the reverse order that they were applied.
Edits can only be undone in the reverse order that they were applied (undoing the most recent edit first).

Advantages of non-destructive (real-time) editing
Effects can usually be adjusted during playback, or at any other time.
Edits may be undone or adjusted at any time in any order.
Multiple effects and edits may be 'stacked' so that they are applied to the audio as an effect chain.
A stack of effects may be changed so that effects are applied in a different order, or effects inserted or removed from the chain.
Some real-time editors support effect automation so that changes to effect parameters may be programmed to occur at specified times during audio playback.

Limitations of non-destructive (real-time) editing 
The waveform does not usually show the effect of processing until the audio has been mixed-down or "bounced" (rendered) to another track.
The number of effects that may be applied is limited by the available processing power of the computer or editing hardware. In some editors, this may be mitigated by "freezing" the track (applying the effect stack destructively).
It is not usually possible to have an effect only on part of a track. To apply a real-time effect to part of a track usually required that the effect is set to turn on at one point and turn off at another.
In multi-track editors, if audio is copied or moved from one track to another, the audio in the new track may sound different from how it sounded in the original track as there may be different real-time effects in each track.
In some applications, mixing down or exporting the edited audio may be slow as all effects and processing needs to be applied.

See also
Audio signal processing
Comparison of digital audio editors
Comparison of free software for audio
List of music software
Music sequencer
Software effect processor
Software synthesizer

References

 
Sound technology